William Elliott (December 4, 1879 - February 5, 1932) was an American stage and screen actor.

Biography
The year of Elliott's birth is sometimes credited as 1885. As a child he played violin with the Weems Juvenile Concert Party. He toured in the stage companies of Herbert Kelcey and Effie Shannon, Mary Shaw, and Richard Mansfield. He was one of the most popular leading men in the first two decades of the twentieth century.

He was the son-in-law of David Belasco through his first wife Augusta Belasco. He then was married to Louise Lagrange who later married Maurice Tourneur.

Elliot was born in Boston and died at New York City.

Filmography
The Lightning Conductor (1914) (as actor and producer)
Face Value (1914) (short)
The Fortune Hunter (1914)
The Tip-Off (1915) (short)
When We Were Twenty-One (1915)
The Model (1915
Comrade John (1915)
Stephen Steps Out (1923) (producer)

References

External links

 
 
North American Theatre Online: William Elliott

1879 births
1932 deaths
Male actors from Boston
20th-century American male actors